Barbora Blažková (born 23 September 1997) is a Czech ski jumper. She has competed at World Cup level since the 2012/13 season, with her best individual result being 23rd place in Oberstdorf on 8 January 2017. At the 2013 European Youth Olympic Winter Festival, she won a mixed team gold medal.

References

1997 births
Living people
Czech female ski jumpers
Sportspeople from Jablonec nad Nisou